Qaleh Dezh (also Romanized as Qal‘eh Dezh and Qal‘eh-ye Dezh) is a village in Mosaferabad Rural District, Rudkhaneh District, Rudan County, Hormozgan Province, Iran. At the 2006 census, its population was 198, in 42 families.

References 

Populated places in Rudan County